Lin Van Hek (aka Lyn van Hecke, born Lyn Whitehead) is an Australian writer, singer, painter, designer and artist. She was a vice-president of the Society of Women Writers and co-founder of the literary-music group Difficult Women.

Early life
Van Hek was born in Melbourne and lived in Europe and India while she was growing up.

Career
Van Hek co-wrote and sang the song "Intimacy" for the film, The Terminator. She later recorded a solo CD River of Life featuring songs of New Zealand writer, Kath Tait. More recently, she has performed with her partner, Joe Dolce in Difficult Women, that began with a series of feminist literary salons van Hek held in the 1980s.

She also worked for over two decades with a group of women in North Vietnam designing, manufacturing and trading in hand-embroidered silk garments and textiles with a focus on fair trade and worker ethics.

She is a prolific painter and writer. She is described by Booker Prize-winning author Keri Hulme as writing "like an angel giving the devil her due."

Awards
 1988 winner of the Melbourne The Age Short Story Award
 2015 Best Australian Poems, edited by Geoff Page.
 2016 & 2017 winner of the Society of Women Writers short story contest.

Bibliography

Novels
 The Hanging Girl (Misfit Books, 1988)
 The Ballad of Siddy Church (Spinifex, 1997)
 Katherine Mansfield's Black Paper Fan (Difficult Women, 2010)

Short fiction
Collections
 The Slain Lamb Stories (Independent, 1979)
 Anna's Box : selected short stories'' (Difficult Women, 2006)
Stories

Book reviews

References

External links
 
Weekend Notes Review
Give It Mouth Interview
Difficult Women Website

1944 births
Living people
Australian women novelists
Quadrant (magazine) people
Writers from Melbourne